Burj Al Fattan is a proposed supertall skyscraper for construction in Dubai Marina. The tower would be built on the site of a former hotel. Burj Al Fattan is projected to have 97 floors and a height of 463 m.

See also
List of tallest buildings in Dubai

References

External links
constructionweekonline.com (2008)
CTBUH

Proposed skyscrapers in Dubai